Madison is a city in and the county seat of Madison County, on the central northern border of Florida, United States. The population was 2,912 at the 2020 census.

History
The territory now known as Madison County was ruled at various times by Great Britain, Spain, and finally the United States. This area was developed for cotton plantations dependent on the labor of enslaved African Americans. After the Civil War and emancipation, many freedmen and their descendants stayed in the region, working as sharecroppers or tenant farmers.

Racial violence of whites against blacks increased after the Reconstruction era, reaching a peak near the turn of the 20th century. The following blacks were lynched in Madison: Savage and James in 1882, Charles Martin, 1 February 1899; both James Denson and his stepson, 7 January 1901; and an unidentified man, 9 February 1906.

Geography

Madison is located slightly east of the center of Madison County at 30°28′N 83°25′W (30.466, –83.415). U.S. Route 90 passes through the center of town, leading west  to Tallahassee, the state capital, and southeast  to Lake City. Interstate 10 passes  to the south of Madison with access from exits 251 and 258. 

Climate

Demographics

2020 census
Note: the US Census treats Hispanic/Latino as an ethnic category. This table excludes Latinos from the racial categories and assigns them to a separate category. Hispanics/Latinos can be of any race.

As of the 2020 United States census, there were 2,912 people, 976 households, and 503 families residing in the city.

2000 census
As of the census of 2000, there were 3,061 people, 1,227 households, and 764 families residing in the city. The racial makeup of the city was 35.74% White, 62.43% African American, 0.10% Native American, 0.49% Asian, 0.03% Pacific Islander, 0.29% from other races, and 0.91% from two or more races. Hispanic or Latino of any race were 2.16% of the population.

There were 1,227 households, out of which 30.8% had children under the age of 18 living with them, 31.6% were married couples living together, 27.2% had a female householder with no husband present, and 37.7% were non-families. 33.0% of all households were made up of individuals, and 16.2% had someone living alone who was 65 years of age or older. The average household size was 2.44 and the average family size was 3.13.

In the city, the population was spread out, with 29.1% under the age of 18, 10.7% from 18 to 24, 24.9% from 25 to 44, 19.0% from 45 to 64, and 16.3% who were 65 years of age or older. The median age was 32 years. For every 100 females, there were 83.4 males. For every 100 females age 18 and over, there were 77.6 males.

The median income for a household in the city was $17,656, and the median income for a family was $22,988. Males had a median income of $24,101 versus $23,750 for females. The per capita income for the city was $10,041. About 37.0% of families and 39.9% of the population were below the poverty line, including 49.2% of those under age 18 and 28.9% of those age 65 or over.

Madison has the city manager-council form of government.   City commissioners are elected from districts and serve for four years.   The commission appoints the city manager and city clerk;   a mayor-commissioner serves a one-year term. The City of Madison has a 14 officer police department, and a 9 firefighter fire department.

The 2008–2009 millage rate is 6.0484.   The General Fund Budget is $7,344,592.
Emphasis is placed on public safety, primarily expanding the Fire Department full-time personnel to implement a 24/48 hour, 3 shift coverage.   In addition, the city plans to address abandoned and rundown property issues.

Climate
This area's climate is characterized by hot, humid summers and generally mild to cool winters.  According to the Köppen Climate Classification system, Madison has a humid subtropical climate, abbreviated "Cfa" on climate maps.

Education

Madison is served by two campuses of the District School Board of Madison County, Madison County Central School (PK–8) and Madison County High School.

North Florida College provides post-secondary instruction for six counties (Hamilton, Jefferson, Lafayette, Madison, Suwannee, and Taylor).    In addition, St. Leo University provides university instruction at the junior-senior level.

Media

Area newspapers published by Greene Publishing are Madison County Carrier and The Madison Enterprise Recorder.

Transportation 
Madison is served by Madison Shuttle, a bus route operated by Big Bend Transit.

Freight service is provided by the Florida Gulf & Atlantic Railroad, which acquired most of the former CSX main line from Pensacola to Jacksonville on June 1, 2019.

Notable people

 LeGarrette Blount, NFL running back
 Lorenzo Cain, MLB player
 Geno Hayes, NFL linebacker
 Colin Kelly, World War II hero
 Scott Kelly, politician
 Jacobbi McDaniel, NFL defensive tackle
 Scott Phillips, drummer for the band Creed
 Jesse Solomon, NFL linebacker
 Chris Thompson, NFL running back
 Ernest Thomas, one of the Groveland Four, killed by a sheriff's posse in Madison in July 1949, exonerated in 2021
 Don Williams, stock car driver

References

External links

 
 Greater Madison County Chamber of Commerce
 Madison County, Florida tourism site
 Madison Enterprise-Recorder newspaper that serves Madison, Florida is available in full-text with images in Florida Digital Newspaper Library

County seats in Florida
Cities in Madison County, Florida
Cities in Florida